Lithodes maja, the Norway king crab or trollkrabbe, is a species of king crab which occurs in colder North Atlantic waters off Europe and North America. It is found along the entire coast of Norway, including  Svalbard, ranging south into the North Sea and Kattegat, the northern half of the British Isles (with a few records off southwest England), and around the Faroe Islands, Iceland, and off south-eastern Greenland. In the West Atlantic, it ranges from the Davis Strait between Greenland and Canada south to The Carolinas in the United States.

The whole body is brown or orange and is covered with large spikes. Like most king crabs, females are asymmetrical, with the left side of the abdomen considerably larger than the right, although specimens with the reverse of this are occasionally found.

The low rate of egg production by this species, in comparison to species fished in the North Pacific, limits its abundance, making it unsuitable for commercial exploitation.

However with the collapse of the Alaskan crab fishery (Red King Crab season has been closed for a second straight season 2023, Snow crab is now closed also).
Sig Hanson of Deadliest Catch fame is currently in Norway trying to develop a market and fishery on Deadliest Catch: The Viking Returns. 

References

Anger, K. “Physiological and Biochemical Changes during Lecithotrophic Larval Development and Early Juvenile Growth in the Northern Stone Crab, Lithodes Maja (Decapoda: Anomura).” SpringerLink, Springer-Verlag, 13 Jan. 1996, link.springer.com/article/10.1007%2FBF00347453.

External links

King crabs
Crustaceans of the Atlantic Ocean
Crustaceans described in 1758
Taxa named by Carl Linnaeus